In enzymology, a succinate-hydroxymethylglutarate CoA-transferase is an enzyme that catalyzes the chemical reaction

succinyl-CoA + 3-hydroxy-3-methylglutarate  succinate + (S)-3-hydroxy-3-methylglutaryl-CoA

Thus, the two substrates of this enzyme are succinyl-CoA and 3-hydroxy-3-methylglutarate, whereas its two products are succinate and (S)-3-hydroxy-3-methylglutaryl-CoA.

This enzyme belongs to the family of transferases, specifically the CoA-transferases.  The systematic name of this enzyme class is succinyl-CoA:3-hydroxy-3-methylglutarate CoA-transferase. Other names in common use include hydroxymethylglutarate coenzyme A-transferase, and dicarboxyl-CoA:dicarboxylic acid coenzyme A transferase.

References

 

EC 2.8.3
Enzymes of unknown structure